Dean Johnson may refer to:

Dean Johnson (politician) (born 1947), American politician & academic administrator
 Dean Johnson (entertainer) (1961–2007), American entertainer
 Dean Edward Johnson (born 1950), American jurist & academic